Knowing or The Knowing may refer to:

 Knowledge
 Knowing (album), a 2015 album by Hubert Wu
 Knowing (film), a 2009 science fiction film
 The Knowing, an album by the doom/death metal band Novembers Doom
 "Knowing", a song by OutKast from the 2003 album Speakerboxxx/The Love Below
 "The Knowing", a 2011 song by The Weeknd from the 2011 album House of Balloons
 "Knowing" as expressed by gnostic groups
 Knowing, a 1988 fragrance by Estée Lauder Companies

See also
 Knowing Me, Knowing You (disambiguation)
 Knowings, a surname